James Arthur Nutter was an American football player and coach. He served as the head football coach at Hampden–Sydney College in Hampden Sydney, Virginia, compiling a record of 3–4. Nutter was the starting quarterback at Virginia Agricultural and Mechanical College and Polytechnic Institute, now known was Virginia Tech, in 1906.

Head coaching record

Football

References

Year of birth missing
Year of death missing
American football quarterbacks
Hampden–Sydney Tigers football coaches
Virginia Tech Hokies football players